Psammitis labradorensis is a species of crab spider in the family Thomisidae. It is found in North America and Greenland.

References

External links

 

Thomisidae
Articles created by Qbugbot
Spiders described in 1887